is a Japanese actress.

Biography
Taira was born in Kobe, Hyōgo Prefecture, and grew up in Akashi, Hyōgo.
.  Taira was in the sixth grade at elementary school when her mother and grandmother applied for her to be in the film I Wish. She passed the audition and debuted as an actress.

In 2011, she made regular appearances in NHK Educational TV's R no Hōsoku.

In 2012, Taira was in Contact Girl Ju Ju Ju from Oha Suta Super Live and released a CD.

In 2015, she starred in the film Scarecrow and Racket: Aki and Tamako's Summer Vacation.

Filmography

TV series

Films

Awards

References

External links
 
 

21st-century Japanese actresses
1998 births
Living people
People from Kobe
Actors from Hyōgo Prefecture